The Ninety-second Minnesota Legislature is the legislature of the U.S. state of Minnesota from January 5, 2021, to January 3, 2023. It is composed of the Senate and House of Representatives, based on the results of the 2020 Senate election and 2020 House election.

Major events 

 January 5, 2021: On the first day of the 92nd Minnesota Legislature, new legislators were sworn in via videoconference due to the COVID-19 pandemic.

Major legislation

Enacted 

 March 23, 2021: Uniform Recognition and Enforcement of Canadian Orders for Protection Act  (Laws 2021, chapter 6)
 May 25, 2021: Energy Conservation and Optimization Act (Laws 2021, chapter 29)
 Omnibus appropriations acts
 June 26, 2021: Omnibus higher education act (Laws 2021, First Special Session chapter 2)
 June 26, 2021: Omnibus agriculture act (Laws 2021, First Special Session chapter 3)
 June 26, 2021: Omnibus commerce and energy act (Laws 2021, First Special Session chapter 4)
 June 26, 2021: Omnibus transportation act (Laws 2021, First Special Session chapter 5)
 June 29, 2021: Omnibus environment and natural resources act (Laws 2021, First Special Session chapter 6)
 June 29, 2021: Omnibus health and human services act (Laws 2021, First Special Session chapter 7)
 June 29, 2021: Omnibus housing act (Laws 2021, First Special Session chapter 8)
 June 30, 2021: Omnibus capital investment act (Laws 2021, First Special Session chapter 9)
 June 30, 2021: Omnibus workforce and labor act (Laws 2021, First Special Session chapter 10)
 June 30, 2021: Omnibus public safety and judiciary act (Laws 2021, First Special Session chapter 11)
 June 30, 2021: Omnibus state government, military affairs, and veterans affairs act (Laws 2021, First Special Session chapter 12)
 June 30, 2021: Omnibus education act (Laws 2021, First Special Session chapter 13)

 June 26, 2021: Omnibus legacy act (Laws 2021, First Special Session chapter 1)
 July 1, 2021: Omnibus tax act (Laws 2021, First Special Session chapter 14)
 April 29, 2022: Unemployment insurance and frontline worker payments act (Laws 2022, chapter 50)
 May 10, 2022: Supplementary veterans and military affairs act (Laws 2022, chapter 50)
 May 22, 2022: Supplementary legacy act (Laws 2022, chapter 77)
 May 22, 2022: Omnibus liquor act (Laws 2022, chapter 86)
 May 26, 2022: Omnibus drought relief and rural broadband act (Laws 2022, chapter 95)
 June 2, 2022: Omnibus mental health act (Laws 2022, chapter 99)
 June 3, 2022: Environment and natural resources trust fund act (Laws 2022, chapter 94)

Proposed 

 Boldface indicates the bill was passed by its house of origin.
 Omnibus cannabis bill (H.F. 600/S.F. 757)
 Sports betting bill (H.F. 778/S.F. 574)
 Universal school lunch and breakfast bill (H.F. 1729)
 Supplemental education finance and policy bill (H.F. 3401/S.F. 2822)
 Transgender sanctuary state bill (H.F. 4822/S.F. 4525)
 Proposed constitutional amendment establishing a fundamental right to a quality public education bill (H.F. 874)
 Parental rights in schools bill (H.F. 3436/S.F. 2909)
 Right to counsel in public housing evictions bill (H.F. 450/S.F. 1290)

Political composition 

 Resignations and new members are discussed in the "Changes in membership" section below.

Senate

House of Representatives

Leadership

Senate 

 President: Jeremy Miller (R)
 President pro tempore: David Tomassoni (I) (until August 11, 2022)

Majority (Republican) leadership 

 Majority Leader:
 Paul Gazelka (until September, 2021)
 Jeremy Miller (since September 9, 2021)
 Deputy Majority Leader: Mark Johnson
 Assistant Majority Leaders:
 Roger Chamberlain
Zach Duckworth
 Karin Housley
 John Jasinski
 Bill Weber

Minority (DFL) leadership 

 Minority Leader:
 Susan Kent (until September, 2021)
 Melisa Franzen (since September 14, 2021)
 Assistant Minority Leaders:
 Nick Frentz
 Mary Kunesh
 Foung Hawj 
 Minority Whips:
Kent Eken
John Hoffman
Ann Rest

House of Representatives 
 Speaker: Melissa Hortman (DFL)
 Speaker pro tempore: Liz Olson (DFL)

Majority (DFL) leadership 

 Deputy Majority Leader: Liz Olson (DFL)
Majority Leader: Ryan Winkler
 Majority Whip: Kaohly Vang Her
 Assistant Majority Leaders:
Heather Edelson
Emma Greenman
Michael Howard
Todd Lippert
Kelly Morrison
Dan Wolgamott

Minority (Republican) leadership 

 Minority Leader: Kurt Daudt
 Deputy Minority Leader: Anne Neu Brindley
 Assistant Minority Leaders:
Dave Baker
Peggy Bennett
Lisa Demuth
Jim Nash
Paul Novotny
Bjorn Olson
Peggy Scott
Paul Torkelson

Members

Senate

House

Demographics

Gender 
129 (64.2%) members of the 92nd Legislature were male, while 72 (35.8%) were female. The House had a slightly higher proportion of women than the Senate.

Race and ethnicity 
27 legislators identified themselves or were identified in a newspaper or book as a member of a minority group.
 Not a minority: 174 (86.6%)
 A minority: 27 (13.4%)
 Black ( Somali): 8 (5.7%)
 Hispanic: 6 (3.0%)
 Hmong: 6 (3.0%)
 American Indian: 4 (2.0%)
 Somali: 3 (1.5%)

Education 
32 members (15.9%) had doctoral-level degrees.

Changes in membership

Senate 
Sen. David Tomassoni passed away August 11, 2022.

House of Representatives 
Rep. Tony Albright resigned effective August 5, 2022.

Committees

Senate 

 Aging and Long-Term Care Policy (Chair: Housley, Vice-Chair: Koran, DFL Lead: Eken)
 Agriculture and Rural Development Finance andPolicy (Chair: Westrom, Vice-Chair Dahms, DFL Lead: Murphy)
 Capital Investment (Chair: Bakk, Vice-Chair: Senjem, DFL Lead: Pappas)
 Civil Law and Data Practices Policy (Chair: Mathews, Vice-Chair: Limmer, DFL Lead: Bigham)
 Commerce and Consumer Protection Finance andPolicy (Chair: Dahms, Vice-Chair: Howe, DFL Lead: Kent)
 Education Finance and Policy (Chair: Chamberlain, Vice-Chair: Eichorn, DFL Lead: Wiger)
 Energy and Utilities Finance and Policy (Chair: Senjem, Vice-Chair: Mathews, DFL Lead: Frentz)
 Environment and Natural Resources Finance (Chair: Ingebrigtsen, Vice-Chair: Rudd, DFL Lead: Torres Ray)
 Environment and Natural Resources Policy and Legacy Finance (Chair: Rudd, Vice-Chair: Weber, DFL Lead: Hawj)
 Finance (Chair: Rosen, Vice-Chair: Ingebrigtsen, DFL Lead: Marty)
 Health and Human Services Finance and Policy (Chair: Utke, Vice-Chair: Draheim, DFL Lead: Wiklund)
 Higher Education Finance and Policy (Chair: Tomassoni, Vice-Chair: Rarick, DFL Lead: Clausen)
 Housing Finance and Policy (Chair: Draheim, Vice-Chair: Duckworth, DFL Lead: Dziedzic)
 Human Services Licensing Policy (Chair: Benson, Vice-Chair: Abeler, DFL Lead: Eaton)
 Human Services Reform Finance and Policy (Chair: Abeler, Vice-Chair: Benson, DFL Lead: Hoffman)
 Jobs and Economic Growth Finance and Policy (Chair: Pratt, Vice-Chair: Housley, DFL Lead: Champion)
 Judiciary and Public Safety Finance and Policy (Chair: Limmer, Vice-Chair: Johnson, DFL Lead: Latz)
 Labor and Industry Policy (Chair: Rarick, Vice-Chair: Dornink, DFL Lead: McEwen)
 Local Government Policy (Chair: Jasinski, Vice-Chair: Newman, DFL Lead: Cwodzinski)
 Mining and Forestry Policy (Chair: Eichorn, Vice-Chair Goggin, DFL Lead: Kunesh)
 Redistricting (Chair: Johnson, Vice-Chair: Kiffmeyer, DFL Lead: Isaacson)
 Rules and Administration (Chair: Miller, Vice-Chair: Johnson), DFL Lead: Franzen)
 State Government Finance and Policy and Elections (Chair: Kiffmeyer, Vice-Chair: Howe, DFL Lead: Carlson)
 Taxes (Chair: Nelson, Vice-Chair: Coleman, DFL Lead: Rest)
 Subcommittee on Property Taxes (Chair: Weber, Vice-Chair Chamberlain, DFL Lead: Klein)
 Technology and Reform Policy (Chair: Koran, Vice-Chair: Westrom, DFL Lead: Port_
 Transportation Finance and Policy (Chair: Newman, Vice-Chair: Jasinski, DFL Lead: Dibble)
 Veterans and Military Affairs Finance and Policy (Chair: Lang, Vice-Chair: Anderson, DFL Lead: Newton)

House of Representatives 

 Agriculture Finance and Policy (Chair: Sundin, Vice-Chair: Vang, GOP Lead: Anderson)
 Capital Investment (Chair: Lee, Vice-Chair: Murphy, GOP Lead: Urdhal)
 Climate and Energy Finance and Policy (Chair: Long, Vice-Chair: Acomb, GOP Lead: Swedzinski)
 Commerce Finance and Policy (Chair: Stephenson, Vice-Chair: Kotyza-Witthuhn, GOP Lead: O'Driscoll)
 Early Childhood Finance and Policy (Chair: Pinto, Vice-Chair: Pryor, GOP Lead: Franson)
 Education Finance (Chair: Davnie, Vice-Chair: Sandstede, GOP Lead: Kresha)
 Education Policy (Chair: Richardson, Vice-Chair: Hassan, GOP Lead: Erickson)
 Environment and Natural Resources Finance and Policy (Chair: Hansen, Vice-Chair: Wazlawik, GOP Lead: Heintzeman)
 Ethics (Chair: Davnie, GOP Lead Erickson)
 Health Finance and Policy (Chair: Liebling, Vice-Chair: Huot, GOP Lead: Schomacker)
 Preventative Health Policy Division (Chair: Freiberg, VIce-Chair: Bierman, GOP Lead: Gruenhagen)
 Higher Education Finance and Policy (Chair: Bernardy, Vice-Chair: Christensen, GOP Lead: O'Neill)
 Housing Finance and Policy (Chair: Hausman, Vice-Chair: Howard, GOP Lead: Theis)
 Human Services Finance and Policy (Chair: Schultz, Vice-Chair: Bahner, GOP Lead: Albright)
 Behavioral Health Policy Division (Chair: Fischer, Vice-Chair: Frederick, GOP Lead: Franke)
 Preventing Homelessness Division (Chair: Gomez, Vice-Chair: Keeler, GOP Lead: Neu Brindley)
 Industrial Education and Economic Development Finance and Policy (Chair: Pelowski, Vice-Chair: Sandell, GOP Lead: Kiel)
 Judiciary Finance and Civil Law (Chair: Becker-Finn, Vice-Chair: Moeller, GOP Lead: Scott)
 Labor, Industry, Veterans and Military Affairs (Chair: Ecklund, Vice-Chair Xiong, T., Co-GOP Leads: Dettmer, McDonald)
 Legacy Finance (Chair: Lillie, Vice-Chair: Jordan, GOP Lead: Green)
 Public Safety and Criminal Justice Reform Finance and Policy (Chair: Mariani, Vice-Chair: Frazier, GOP Lead: Johnson)
 Redistricting (Chair: Murphy, Vice-Chair: Klevorn, GOP Lead: Torkelson)
 Rules and Legislative Administration (Chair: Winkler, Vice-Chair: Agbaje, GOP Lead: Daudt)
 Subcommittee on Legislative Process Reform (Chair: Pelowski, Vice-Chair: Wolgamott, GOP Lead: Daudt)
 State Government Finance and Elections (Chair: Nelson, M., Vice-Chair: Carlson, GOP Lead: Nash)
 Local Government Division (Chair: Masin, Vice-Chair: Elkins, GOP Lead: Quam)
 Taxes (Chair: Marquart, Vice-Chair: Lislegard, GOP Lead: Davids)
 Property Taxes Division (Chair: Youakim, Vice-Chair: Gomez, GOP Lead: Hertaus)
 Transportation Finance and Policy (Chair: Hornstein, Vice-Chair Koegel, GOP Lead: Petersburg)
 Ways and Means (Chair: Moran, Vice-Chair: Olson, L., GOP Lead: Garofalo)
 Workforce and Business Development (Chair: Noor, Vice-Chair: Xiong, J., GOP Lead: Hamilton)

Administrative officers

Senate 

 Secretary: Cal Ludeman
 First Assistant Secretary: Colleen Pacheco
 Second Assistant Secretary: Mike Linn
 Engrossing Secretary: Melissa Mapes
 Sergeant at Arms: Sven Lindquist
 Assistant Sergeant at Arms: Marilyn Logan
 Chaplain: Mike Smith

House of Representatives 

 Chief Clerk: Patrick Murphy
 First Assistant Chief Clerk: Tim Johnson
 Second Assistant Chief Clerk: Gail Romanowski
 Chief Sergeant at Arms: Bob Meyerson
 Assistant Sergeant at Arms: Erica Brynildson
 Assistant Sergeant at Arms: Andrew Olson
 Index Clerk: Carl Hamre

Notes

References

External links 

 Legislature
 2019 Regular Session Laws
 2019, 1st Special Session Laws
 2020 Regular Session Laws
 2020, 1st Special Session Laws
 2020, 2nd Special Session Laws
 2020, 3rd Special Session Laws
 Senate
 List of bill summaries prepared by the Senate Counsel, Research and Fiscal Analysis Office
 List of act summaries prepared by the Senate Counsel, Research and Fiscal Analysis Office
 Fiscal tracking spreadsheets prepared by the Senate Counsel, Research and Fiscal Analysis Office
 House of Representatives
 List of bill summaries prepared by the House Research Department
 List of act summaries prepared by the House Research Department
 Fiscal tracking spreadsheets prepared by the House Fiscal Analysis Department

Minnesota legislative sessions
2010s in Minnesota
2021 in Minnesota
Minnesota